Hanchang Town is a town and the county seat of Pingjiang in Hunan, China. It was reformed through the amalgamation of Chengguan Town and Dongyuan Township in 1995. The town is located in the centre of the western Pingjiang County, it is bordered by Sanyang Township to the south and south east, Meixian Town to the north east, Wengjiang Town to the north west and west. Through the amalgamation of village-level divisions in 2016, the town has 14 villages and 16 communities under its jurisdiction, Its seat is Jingfuping Community.

History
Hanchang is an ancient town with a history of more than one thousand years. Hanchang Town was established in 1935, it took the name of the ancient Hanchang County,  the seat of the ancient Changjiang County was transferred to the place (Heling of historic name) in 809 AD (Tang dynasty). Changjiang County was renamed to the present name of Pingjiang County in 923 AD, from then on, it has been the county seat of Pingjiang.

After its establishment in 1935, its name went through several revisions. It was renamed as Chengguan District in June 1950, as Chengguan Town in December 1950, as Penghuang Commune in September 1958, as Chengguan Commune in 1959, as Chengguan Town in 1961. It was once again reformed as Hanchang Town through the amalgamation of Chengguan Town and Dongyuan Township and named after the historical name in 1995.

Administrative divisions

Amalgamation of village-level divisions in 2016

References

Pingjiang County
County seats in Hunan